Vock is a surname. Notable people with this surname include:

 Anna Vock (1885–1962), Swiss journalist and LGBT activist
 Armin Vock (born 1952), Swiss gymnast
 Harald Vock (1925–1998), German television producer and director
 Randy Vock (born 1994), Swiss wrestler

See also
 Vack